Pucca is an animated series based on the original web shorts created by Boo Kyoung Kim and Calvin Kim from the South Korean company VOOZ Character System.The first two seasons were a co-production between VOOZ and Jetix Europe, animated in Flash by Canadian studio Studio B Productions directed by Greg Sullivan. The third season is a co-production between VOOZ and the Planeta Group, and is animated in 3D-CGI Animation.

Series overview

Episodes

Season 1 (2006–07)

Season 2 (2008)

Season 3: Love Recipe (2018–19) 
{| class="wikitable plainrowheaders" style="width:100%; margin:auto;"
! style="background-color: #cccccc; color:black;" | No. inseries
! style="background-color: #cccccc; color:black;" | No. inseason
! style="background-color: #cccccc; color:black;" | Title
! style="background-color: #cccccc; color:black;" | Written by
! style="background-color: #cccccc; color:black;" | Storyboarded by
! style="background-color: #cccccc; color:black;" | Original air date
|-

{{Episode list
|EpisodeNumber=52b-52c
|EpisodeNumber2=13b-13c
|Title= The Disappearance of Goh-Rong
|WrittenBy=
|Aux2=
|OriginalAirDate=
|ShortSummary=Part 1: Dong King was sick of Fyah and the rest of his crew's constant failures, so he replaces them with somebody who is more worthy. A man named Edward attempts to get rid of Goh-Rong and makes it disappear.

Part 2''': With the restaurant disappeared, Pucca is sad that her uncles, the restaurant, and Garu cannot be found anywhere. However, when Pucca finds out the identity of the responsible person, she takes action with Abyo and Ching by her side.
|LineColor=cccccc
}}

|}

 Home media 
In July 2007, Jetix Europe signed a home video deal with Shout! Factory to release Pucca on Region 1 DVD. 

All five releases featured episodes from the first season. The fifth and final volume, titled Sooga Super Squad, featured four segment-episodes from the second season.

 See also 
 Pucca''

References 

Pucca
Pucca episodes
Pucca